is a railway station in Minami-ku, Hamamatsu, Shizuoka Prefecture, Japan, operated by the Central Japan Railway Company (JR Tōkai ).

Lines

Station layout
Takatsuka Station has one side platform serving track 1, and one island platform, serving tracks 2 and 3 (which were formerly used by freight trains and is no longer in use). The two platforms are connected by a footbridge. The station building has automated ticket machines, TOICA automated turnstiles and is staffed.

Platforms

}

Adjacent stations

History

Takatsuka station opened on 1 July 1929. With the privatization of Japanese National Railways (JNR) on 1 April 1987, the station came under the control of JR Central.

Station numbering was introduced to the section of the Tōkaidō Line operated JR Central in March 2018; Takatsuka Station was assigned station number CA35.

Passenger statistics
In fiscal 2017, the station was used by an average of 2820 passengers daily (boarding passengers only).

Surrounding area
Suzuki Motors head office

See also
 List of railway stations in Japan

References
Yoshikawa, Fumio. Tokaido-sen 130-nen no ayumi. Grand-Prix Publishing (2002) .

External links

Stations of Central Japan Railway Company
Tōkaidō Main Line
Railway stations in Japan opened in 1929
Railway stations in Shizuoka Prefecture
Railway stations in Hamamatsu